Larysa Berezhna (also  - Larisa Berezhnaya; born 28 February 1961) is a retired long jumper, born in Kyiv, who represented the USSR and later Ukraine. She first gained recognition with a bronze medal at the 1989 World Indoor Championships and a fourth place at the 1990 European Championships. In 1991 she won a gold medal at the World Indoor Championships and a bronze medal at the outdoor World Championships. The same year she jumped 7.24 metres, which puts her 14th in the all-time performers list. She competed at the 1992 Olympic Games but was forced to withdraw during the qualifying round due to injury.

International competitions

Note: At the 1992 Olympics, Berezhna had one foul in the qualifying round before withdrawing from the competition.

References

 Exclusive Photos of Larysa Berezhna

1961 births
Living people
Sportspeople from Kyiv
Ukrainian female long jumpers
Soviet female long jumpers
Olympic athletes of the Unified Team
Athletes (track and field) at the 1992 Summer Olympics
Goodwill Games medalists in athletics
Competitors at the 1986 Goodwill Games
Competitors at the 1990 Goodwill Games
World Athletics Championships athletes for the Soviet Union
World Athletics Championships athletes for Ukraine
World Athletics Championships medalists
World Athletics Indoor Championships medalists
World Athletics Indoor Championships winners
Japan Championships in Athletics winners